Under Habsburg rule, a junta (or jointe) was an administrative body ruled in personal union with the Spanish Habsburgs.  Juntas existed in Spain, Italy, and other European countries; in the Low Countries, the French name jointe was also officially used.  Some territories maintained their juntas even after being brought under the imperial Austrian branch of the dynasty.

Philippine dynasty